The 2005 New Mexico Lobos football team represented the University of New Mexico during the 2005 NCAA Division I-A football season. New Mexico competed as a member of the Mountain West Conference (MW), and played their home games in the University Stadium. The Lobos were led by eighth-year head coach Rocky Long.

Schedule

References

New Mexico
New Mexico Lobos football seasons
New Mexico Lobos football